Yakhteh Khan (also Romanized as Yakhteh Khān; also known as Yakhteh Khāneh) is a village in Bilavar Rural District, in the Central District of Kamyaran County, Kurdistan Province, Iran. At the 2006 census, its population was 122, in 30 families. The village is populated by Kurds.

References 

Towns and villages in Kamyaran County
Kurdish settlements in Kurdistan Province